Eccentrix Remixes is a 1999 remix album by Yello. It was released on January 25, 1999, on Mercury Records label.

Track listing
 "The Race" (Brake Light Mix)" – 6:50
 "How How (Papa-Who-Ma-Mix)" (Remixer: Fluke) – 5:51
 "More (Rockabilly Mix)" – 6:14
 "Do It" (Marky P. & Teri B. Dub) – 7:46
 "Topaz" (Insect Mix) – 3:36
 "How How (In Silence Mix)" (Remixer: Plutone) – 4:32
 "On Track (Doug Laurent's First Journey)" – 7:33
 "Vicious Games" (Boris Blank & Olaf Wollschläger Mix) – 6:34
 "Rubberbandman" (Rubber Mix) – 5:57
 "She's Got a Gun (Live at the Palladium N.Y.)" – 4:08
 "To the Sea (TSWL Mix)" (Remixer: Ian Pooley) – 4:48

References

Yello remix albums
1999 remix albums
Mercury Records remix albums